The Aurore MB 04 Souris Bulle is a French ultralight aircraft, designed by Michel Barry and produced by Aurore Sarl of Sauvagnon. The aircraft is supplied as a kit or as plans for amateur construction.

Design and development
The Souris Bulle was designed to comply with the Fédération Aéronautique Internationale microlight rules. The aircraft features a strut-braced high-wing, a two-seats-in-tandem enclosed cockpit under a bubble canopy, fixed conventional landing gear and a single engine in tractor configuration. The rear seat has very limited visibility.

The aircraft is made from wood with its flying surfaces covered in doped aircraft fabric. Its  span wing employs single supporting struts. The standard recommended engine is the  JPX 4T two-stroke powerplant or a  Volkswagen air-cooled engine. The Souris Bulle has a glide ratio of 18:1.

In 2015 the aircraft kit was €13,300 and plans sold for €380. The manufacturer estimates the construction time from the supplied kit as 650 hours.

Specifications (MB 04 Souris Bulle)

References

External links

MB 04 Souris Bulle
1990s French ultralight aircraft
Homebuilt aircraft
Single-engined tractor aircraft